The 4th (Meerut) Cavalry Brigade was a cavalry brigade of the British Indian Army that formed part of the Indian Army during the First World War.  It was formed as 14th (Meerut) Cavalry Brigade in November 1914 to replace the original Meerut Cavalry Brigade that had been mobilized as the 7th (Meerut) Cavalry Brigade for service on the Western Front.  It remained in India throughout the war, before taking part in the Third Anglo-Afghan War in 1919.

The brigade continued to exist between the wars and by September 1939 it was designated 3rd (Meerut) Cavalry Brigade.  It briefly served as part of the Indian Army during the Second World War before being broken up in February 1940.

History

First World War
At the outbreak of the First World War, the Meerut Cavalry Brigade was part of the 7th (Meerut) Division.  It was mobilized in August 1914 as the 7th (Meerut) Cavalry Brigade, assigned to the newly formed 2nd Indian Cavalry Division and sailed from Bombay on 19 October for the Western Front.  Likewise, the 7th (Meerut) Division was transferred to France in August 1914.

The 7th Meerut Divisional Area was formed in September 1914 to take over the area responsibilities of the 7th (Meerut) Division and on 21 November 1914 a new 14th (Meerut) Cavalry Brigade was formed in 7th Meerut Divisional Area to replace the original brigade.  It was renumbered as the 4th (Meerut) Cavalry Brigade in February 1915.  The brigade served with the division in India throughout the First World War.

Between the world wars
In May 1919, the brigade was mobilized to take part in the Third Anglo-Afghan War.

The brigade continued to exist between the world wars.  In September 1920 it was redesignated as the 3rd Indian Cavalry Brigade and later in the decade it became the 3rd (Meerut) Cavalry Brigade.

Second World War
At the outbreak of the Second World War, the brigade was under the command of Meerut District.  The brigade was broken up in February 1940.  Its Headquarters and some units formed the nucleus of The Armoured Brigade (later 2nd Indian Armoured Brigade).

Orders of battle

Commanders
The 14th (Meerut) Cavalry Brigade / 4th (Meerut) Cavalry Brigade / 3rd Indian Cavalry Brigade / 3rd (Meerut) Cavalry Brigade had the following commanders:

A note on numbering
The brigade carried several numbers during its existence.  This can be a cause for confusion as other, unrelated, Indian cavalry brigades carried the same numbers at different times:
 the brigade was numbered as 14th from November 1914 to February 1915.  Another 14th Cavalry Brigade was formed in April 1918 by merging elements of the 9th (Secunderabad) Cavalry Brigade (withdrawn from the Western Front) with the British yeomanry 7th Mounted Brigade in Egypt.  It served in the Sinai and Palestine Campaign and was broken up in September 1919.
 the brigade was numbered as 4th from February 1915 to September 1920, when it was renumbered as 3rd Indian Cavalry Brigade.  At this point, the Lucknow Cavalry Brigade was numbered as the 4th Indian Cavalry Brigade, until it was broken up in 1923.  As a result, the 5th Indian Cavalry Brigade (former Secunderabad Cavalry Brigade) was renumbered as the 4th Indian Cavalry Brigade and later as the 4th (Secunderabad) Cavalry Brigade.
 the brigade was numbered as 3rd from September 1920 to February 1940.  The Ambala Cavalry Brigade had mobilized in August 1914 as 3rd (Ambala) Cavalry Brigade and served on the Western Front until it was broken up in March 1918.  Another 3rd Indian Cavalry Brigade was formed in Mesopotamia after the end of the war for occupation duties.  It drew, in part, on units that had earlier served in the Mesopotamian Campaign.  It was broken up in late 1920.

See also

 List of Indian Army Brigades in World War II

Notes

References

Bibliography

External links
 
 

C03
Cavalry brigades of the British Indian Army
Military units and formations established in 1914
Military units and formations disestablished in 1940